Bengt Beckman (30 September 1925 – 13 March 2012) was a Swedish mathematician, university professor and bestselling author.

He has worked as a research engineer at Tandem laboratory in Uppsala, Sweden. As an author, he has written about cryptography in Sweden, particularly about Arne Beurling.

Publications 

Some of his books and papers are:

 Swedish cryptography achievements, Bonniers, 1996, 
 The world's first encryption machine - Gripenstiernas cipher-Machine 1786, the National Defense Radio Establishment, Bromma, 1999
 Thus the Z machine was broken - reconstruction of the Lorenz SZ40 / 42, the National Defense Radio Establishment, Bromma, 1999
 Swedish Signal Intelligence: 1900-1945, Frank Cass Publishers, 2002, 
 In front of your eyes - drawings and comments, Johanneshov, 2010

References

External links
 https://web.archive.org/web/20170330083226/http://katalog.uu.se/profile/?id=XX2103

1925 births
2012 deaths
20th-century Swedish mathematicians
Academic staff of Uppsala University
Swedish cryptographers